The 2002 Hawaii gubernatorial election was held on November 5, 2002, to select the Governor of Hawaii. Incumbent Democratic Governor of Hawaii Ben Cayetano was term-limited and therefore could not run for re-election. Former Maui Mayor Linda Lingle, who had narrowly lost the 1998 election, was nominated once again by the Republicans while Lieutenant Governor Mazie Hirono earned the Democratic nomination in a tight race. Lingle and Hirono duked it out in a hard-fought campaign, with Hirono's campaign crippled by allegations of corruption within the Hawaii Democratic Party and many voters desiring a change.

Ultimately, Lingle defeated Hirono in a close election, making her the first Republican Governor of Hawaii elected since 1959 and the state's first-ever female governor. Lingle and Hirono would face off again 10 years later in the 2012 U.S. Senate election, where Hirono won 63% - 37%, making Lingle the first female Governor and Hirono the first female U.S. Senator in Hawaii history.

Democratic primary

Candidates
Mazie Hirono, Lieutenant Governor of Hawaii
Ed Case, Majority Leader of the Hawaii House of Representatives
D. G. Anderson, 1982 and 1986 Republican nominee for Governor of Hawaii, former Hawaii State Senator
George Nitta, Jr., radio personality
Art P. Reyes, perennial candidate
Joe Fernandez, school bus driver

Results

Republican primary

Candidates
Linda Lingle, former Mayor of Maui, 1998 Republican nominee for Governor of Hawaii
John Carroll, former Hawaii State Representative
Crystal Young

Results

General election

Campaign
Lingle was critical of the way that Hirono had handled education and economic issues as lieutenant governor; in a TV spot premiered by the Lingle campaign in September, the Republican noted that "Reading scores are now among the worst in the nation. We rank last in jobs creation and first in poverty increase" and argued that Hirono bore part of the blame. Hirono responded that low reading scores could be attributed to the fact that many Hawaiian students — such as Hirono, herself an immigrant from Japan — were learning English as a second language. She also pointed to legislation which she had supported to "improve teacher quality" and boost test scores, and commented that "I'd like to know what Linda has done" to further the cause.

Predictions

Results

References

External links
Official campaign websites (Archived)
Linda Lingle for Governor
Mazie Hirono for Governor

2002
Gubernatorial
2002 United States gubernatorial elections